Chinese-Indonesian author Kwee Tek Hoay (1886–1951) wrote 62 books or serials (36 non-fiction and 26 fiction), 3 essays, and 11 stage plays. He also edited 5 magazines and translated 15 books or other writings. Aside from these works, listed below, he is known to have written numerous reports, obituaries, articles, and film reviews as a magazine editor. Many of Kwee's religious books (as well as some novels) were reprinted by the Surakarta-based publisher Swastika in the early 1960s. Several further books were reprinted in commemoration of the 100th anniversary of Kwee's birth. In the 2000s, ten of his works were reprinted as part of the Kesastraan Melayu Tionghoa dan Kebangsaan Indonesia series. Two of his works, the novel Boenga Roos dari Tjikembang (1927) and the study Atsal Moelanja Timboel Pergerakan Tionghoa di Indonesia (1936/37), have been translated into English.

Kwee began his writing career in 1919 with the stage play Allah jang Palsoe. During the 1920s, he wrote several novels and stage plays while also working as a journalist, first for Sin Po then for Sin Bin. He established his first magazine, Panorama, in 1925; he went on to manage four further magazines, including the literary-oriented Moestika Romans and the religious Sam Kauw Gwat Po. After 1930 Kwee began to focus predominantly on religious texts, particularly those related to Buddhism, Confucianism, and Chinese folk religion, but also relating to Islam. A fluent English speaker, Kwee adapted several of his writings – both fiction and non-fiction – from publications outside the Dutch East Indies. His last work before his death, seven volumes related to various aspects of Confucianism, was published in 1950.

Thematically, Chinese teachings and culture feature prominently in Kwee's works, in which reincarnation and mysticism are common. Criticism of the ethnic Chinese in the Indies is also present; Allah jang Palsoe, for instance, criticised the blind pursuit of money while ignoring cultural and societal norms, whilst the stageplay Korbannja Kong Ek criticised the management of the Tiong Hoa Hwee Koan and its schools.

The following list is divided into tables based on the type of works contained within. The tables are initially arranged alphabetically by title, although they are also sortable. Titles are in the original spelling, with a literal English translation underneath. Years given are for the first publication; later reprintings are not counted.


Non-fiction books and serials

Fiction books and serials

Magazines

Stage plays

Translations

References

Works cited

 

Bibliographies by writer
 
Bibliographies of Indonesian writers